Richard Wayne Johnston is an American country blues musician. In 2001 he won the Blues Foundation's International Blues Challenge and its Albert King Award for most promising blues guitarist.

His work as a street musician on Beale Street in Memphis, Tennessee, was documented in the Alabama PBS film Richard Johnston: Hill Country Troubadour. The film, directed by Max Shores, featured Johnston singing and playing his Lowebow cigar box guitar. It won first place in the professional documentary film category at the 2007 George Lindsey/UNA Film Festival.

Johnston studied under blues artists including R.L. Burnside, Junior Kimbrough and Jessie Mae Hemphill. His first album, Foot Hill Stomp (2002), featured Hemphill on vocals and tambourine, with assistance from R.L. Burnside's grandson, Cedric Burnside, and others.

His second album, Official Bootleg #1 (2004), was assisted by Hemphill, Cedric Burnside, and other artists. Richard also works under the name Boozer Ramirez in the Hawaiian islands.

See also
 List of films based on blues music
 Memphis blues

References

External links
 Indie Grits Film Festival Films: Richard Johnston: Hill country Troubadour
 Richard Johnston website
 Richard Johnston at Max Shores' website

American blues singers
American blues guitarists
American male guitarists
Living people
Year of birth missing (living people)